WBET (1230 AM) is an AM sports radio station located in Sturgis, Michigan.

References

External links

BET
Radio stations established in 1989